Glass Beach is a beach in Eleele, an industrial area in Kauai, Hawaii, that is made of sea glass. It is in Hanapepe Bay, near Port Allen Harbor. The beach's regular rock is basalt, but the sea glass formed after years of discarded glass.

See also
There are similar beaches in Fort Bragg and Benicia, California.

References

External links

 
 Kauai Glass Beach Information

Beaches of Kauai
Glass beaches